Polyporus ciliatus is a species of fungus in the genus Polyporus.

References

External links
 
 

ciliatus